Addison is a Chicago "L" station on the Chicago Transit Authority Red Line. It is located in the Wrigleyville area of the Lakeview neighborhood of Chicago, Illinois, at 940 West Addison Street with city block coordinates at 3600 North at 940 West.  Addison directly serves Wrigley Field, home of Major League Baseball's Chicago Cubs. The station is within the shadow of the historic baseball stadium, which was built with convenient access to the "L" in mind.

Following Cubs games, this station can become heavily crowded; many fans often use the next station to the north, Sheridan. Purple Line weekday rush hour express service use the outside tracks but do not stop at this station.

Transit art
Chicago artist Steve Musgrave has several murals featuring Cubs legends on display at the Addison station, which he adopted as part of the CTA's Adopt-A-Station program in 1998.  Four large murals feature Cubs legends Billy Williams, Ferguson Jenkins, "Mr. Cub," Ernie Banks and Ryne Sandberg. A smaller painting of Harry Caray was added later.

Since 1998, Musgrave has also designed posters commemorating the annual Cubs–Sox crosstown series. Beginning in 2003, the CTA has also issued farecards featuring the poster design.

Service

Prior to 2007, southbound afternoon Purple Line Express trains stopped at the station before weekday evening Cubs games, to speed travel times for customers from Evanston, Skokie and Wilmette.  In an effort to prevent delays due to Brown Line construction just south of the station, Purple Line Express trains now stop at the nearby Sheridan station instead.

From March 5, 2015 to March 21, 2016, AM Loop-bound Purple Line express trains shared 95th-bound Red Line tracks and stopped at Addison. This was due to the first phase of the Wilson station reconstruction.

Bus connections
CTA
 22 Clark (Owl Service)
 152 Addison

Pace
 282 Rolling Meadows–Wrigley Field Express
 779 Hillside–Wrigley Field Express

References

External links

 Addison (Howard Line) station page at Chicago-L.org
 Train schedule (PDF) at CTA official site
Addison station page CTA official site
Addison Street entrance from Google Maps Street View

CTA Red Line stations
Railway stations in the United States opened in 1900
Chicago Cubs
1900 establishments in Illinois